Azolimnos Syros is the most near beach in the Ermoupoli, which is particularly developed tourist in order that it can comfortably entertains in the lodgings her visitor and to offers wine and traditional tidbits in local taverns.

References

Beaches of Greece